Byzas (Ancient Greek: Βύζας, Býzas) was the legendary founder of Byzantium (Ancient Greek: Βυζάντιον, Byzántion), the city later known as Constantinople and then Istanbul.

Background
The legendary history of the founding of Byzantium as recorded by later Byzantine authors is most fully preserved in the Patria of Constantinople by 6th century writer Hesychius of Miletus. The Patria recorded multiple versions of the city's founding myth. Hesychius' preferred account says the city received its name from Io, daughter of the Argive king, who was raped by Inachus and then transformed into a cow. Zeus had fallen in love with Io, and in a jealous fit, Hera sent a gadfly to drive Io from one place to another in torment until she arrived in Thrace, giving birth to Ceroessa, the mother of Byzas by Poseidon, for whom the Golden Horn was named Ceras. One tradition holds that the city was founded by the Argives who received an oracle at Delphi with reference to the Golden Horn. Another claims Megarians (led by Byzas) are the founders, and yet another says Byzas is the son of a local nymph, Semystra.

Founder of Byzantium
Byzantion was an ancient Greek colony, on which the city of Constantinople was built.
The founder of Byzantion, Byzas, was son of King Nisos of Megara.

During the 7th century BC, the Greek city-states were expanding and establishing new colonies. The Dorian city-state of Megara, near Athens, was also searching for sites to set up yet another colony. After asking the oracle of Delphi, the Megarean king Nisos sent his son Byzas in search of "the land opposite the city of the blind".

When Byzas arrived to where the Sea of Marmara meets the Bosporus, on the border of Europe and Asia, he realized the meaning of the oracle. On the Asian shore, opposite to where he was, a colony, Chalcedon, had already been established. Byzas decided that Chalcedon was the prophesied 'city of the blind', as it had not taken advantage of the European shore.

To build his new city, he selected the European shore of the south end of Bosporos and gave the new city his name, Byzantion.
Later, Byzas married Fidalea, daughter of king Varvizos (or Varvisios) of Thrace. The inhabitants of ancient Byzantion considered Byzas as their founder and, according to ancient sources, honoured him by raising a statue of Byzas and his wife, Fidalea, in a noticeable place in the city.

The ancients had a very good understanding of the advantages that Byzantion had over Chalcedon, as the colony of Byzantion commanded the entrance to two seas, the entrance to both the Black Sea, through Sea of Bosporos, and the Aegean Sea, through the Sea of Marmaras (Propontis was is its ancient name).

Apart from the story of the Pythian oracle of Apollonian Delphi, as described by the Greek geographer and historian Strabo (63 BC - 23 AD) and by the Roman historian Tacitus (1st century AD), there are other versions of the maxim referring to the "blind people". The Greek historian Herodotos (5th century BC) wrote that when the Persian general Megabazus arrived at Byzantium, he called the people of Chalcedon blind because although they had a choice of sites, they chose the worse one.

References

Sources
A.A.Vasiliev, History of the Byzantine Empire, Univ. Of Wisconsin Press, Vol.I, p.57, 58
Afrodite Kamaras, EHW, 2008, Byzas (URL: <http://www.ehw.gr/l.aspx?id=10948>)
Alexander Kazhdan, The Oxford Dictionary Of Byzantium, Oxford Un.Press, print publication 1991, online version 2005, Vol.I, entry "Byzantion"
Herodotos, Ιστορίαι, Histories, Book D, 6.33
Strabo, Γεωγραφικά, Geography, 7.6
Procopios, Περί Κτισμάτων, De aedificiis, Α.5

Ancient Megarians
Children of Poseidon
Kings in Greek mythology
Mythological city founders